Charlotte, Lady Williams-Wynn (née Grenville;  – 29 September 1830), was a British aristocrat.

Williams-Wynn was born in Llanforda, Oswestry. She was the eldest child of the Prime Minister George Grenville and his wife, the former Elizabeth Wyndham, daughter of the Tory statesman Sir William Wyndham, 3rd Baronet. Lady Williams-Wynn was a first cousin of Prime Minister William Pitt through her paternal aunt Hester Grenville, who married William Pitt, 1st Earl of Chatham.

Her mother and father died in 1769 and 1770 respectively, and guardianship of their daughter Charlotte was assumed by George's elder brother, Richard Grenville-Temple, 2nd Earl Temple. On 21 December 1771, she married Sir Watkin Williams-Wynn, 4th Baronet, and became known as Lady Williams-Wynn. The couple had eight children, six of whom survived to adulthood, including Watkin (who went on to be the 5th Baronet), Charles, Henry, and Henrietta, who married Thomas Cholmondeley, 1st Baron Delamere of Vale Royal.

Upon her husband's death, Lady Williams-Wynn became the sole administrator of his Welsh estates under the terms of his will, and functioned as such until her eldest son reached the age of majority.

References

1750s births
1830 deaths
Charlotte
People from Oswestry
Children of prime ministers of the United Kingdom
Wives of baronets
18th-century British women
19th-century British women